James de Congalton Hepburn (April 23, 1878 – December 24, 1955) was a politician in Ontario, Canada. He represented Prince Edward—Lennox in the Legislative Assembly of Ontario from 1937 to 1948 as a Conservative (1937-1943) and Progressive Conservative (1943-1948).

He was born in Picton, Ontario, the son of Arthur W. Hepburn, who operated a fleet of steamships. Hepburn was educated at Trinity College School in Port Hope and entered his father's business after completing his schooling. He also served three years as reeve of Picton.

Hepburn became speaker following the resignation of William James Stewart. He served as speaker of the Legislature of Ontario from March 24, 1947, to April 16, 1948. He was defeated when he ran for reelection in 1948.

He died at home in Picton at the age of 77.

References

External links

Speakers of the Legislative Assembly of Ontario
Progressive Conservative Party of Ontario MPPs
1878 births
1955 deaths